Cheshmeh Mahdi (also Romanized as Cheshmeh Mahdī) is a village in Howmeh Rural District, in the Central District of Harsin County, Kermanshah Province, Iran. At the 2006 census, its population was 90, in 18 families.

References 

Populated places in Harsin County